Baldr (also Balder, Baldur) is a god in Germanic mythology. In Norse mythology, Baldr is a son of the god Odin and the goddess Frigg, and has numerous brothers, such as Thor and Váli.

During the 12th century, Danish accounts by Saxo Grammaticus and other Danish Latin chroniclers recorded a euhemerized account of his story. Compiled in Iceland during the 13th century, but based on older Old Norse poetry, the Poetic Edda and the Prose Edda contain numerous references to the death of Baldr as both a great tragedy to the Æsir and a harbinger of Ragnarök.

According to Gylfaginning, a book of Snorri Sturluson's Prose Edda, Baldr's wife is Nanna and their son is Forseti. Baldr had the greatest ship ever built, Hringhorni, and there is no place more beautiful than his hall, Breidablik.

Name
The Old Norse theonym Baldr ('brave, defiant'; also 'lord, prince') and its various Germanic cognates – including Old English Bældæg and Old High German Balder (or Palter) – probably stems from Proto-Germanic *Balðraz ('Hero, Prince'; cf. Old Norse mann-baldr 'great man', Old English bealdor 'prince, hero'), itself a derivative of *balþaz, meaning 'brave' (cf. Old Norse ballr 'hard, stubborn', Gothic balþa* 'bold, frank', Old English beald 'bold, brave, confident', Old Saxon bald 'valiant, bold', Old High German bald 'brave, courageous').

This etymology was originally proposed by Jacob Grimm (1835), who also speculated on a comparison with the Lithuanian báltas ('white', also the name of a light-god) based on the semantic development from 'white' to 'shining' then 'strong'. According to linguist Vladimir Orel, this could be linguistically tenable. Philologist Rudolf Simek also argues that the Old English Bældæg should be interpreted as meaning 'shining day', from a Proto-Germanic root *bēl- (cf. Old English bæl, Old Norse bál 'fire') attached to dæg ('day').

Old Norse also shows the usage of the word as an honorific in a few cases, as in baldur î brynju (Sæm. 272b) and herbaldr (Sæm. 218b), in general epithets of heroes. In continental Saxon and Anglo-Saxon tradition, the son of Woden is called not Bealdor but Baldag (Saxon) and Bældæg, Beldeg (Anglo-Saxon), which shows association with "day", possibly with Day personified as a deity. This, as Grimm points out, would agree with the meaning "shining one, white one, a god" derived from the meaning of Baltic baltas, further adducing Slavic Belobog and German Berhta.

Attestations

Merseburg Incantation
One of the two Merseburg Incantations names Baldere, but also mentions a figure named Phol, considered to be a byname for Baldr (as in Scandinavian Falr, Fjalarr; (in Saxo) Balderus : Fjallerus). The incantation relates of Phol ende Odin riding to the woods, where the foot of Baldr's foal is sprained. Sinthgunt (the sister of the sun), Freyja and Odin sing to the foot in order for it to heal.

Poetic Edda

Unlike the Prose Edda, in the Poetic Edda the tale of Baldr's death is referred to rather than recounted at length. Baldr is mentioned in Völuspá, in Lokasenna, and is the subject of the Eddic poem Baldr's Dreams.

Among the visions which the Völva sees and describes in Völuspá is Baldr's death. In stanza 32, the Völva says she saw the fate of Baldr "the bleeding god":

In the next two stanzas, the Völva refers to Baldr's killing, describes the birth of Váli for the slaying of Höðr and the weeping of Frigg:

In stanza 62 of Völuspá, looking far into the future, the Völva says that Höðr and Baldr will come back, with the union, according to Bellows, being a symbol of the new age of peace:

Baldr is mentioned in two stanzas of Lokasenna, a poem which describes a flyting between the gods and the god Loki. In the first of the two stanzas, Frigg, Baldr's mother, tells Loki that if she had a son like Baldr, Loki would be killed:

In the next stanza, Loki responds to Frigg, and says that he is the reason Baldr "will never ride home again":

The Eddic poem Baldr's Dreams opens with the gods holding a council discussing why Baldr had had bad dreams:

Odin then rides to Hel to a Völva's grave and awakens her using magic. The Völva asks Odin, who she does not recognize, who he is, and Odin answers that he is Vegtam ("Wanderer"). Odin asks the Völva for whom are the benches covered in rings and the floor covered in gold. The Völva tells him that in their location mead is brewed for Baldr, and that she spoke unwillingly, so she will speak no more:

Odin asks the Völva to not be silent and asks her who will kill Baldr. The Völva replies and says that Höðr will kill Baldr, and again says that she spoke unwillingly, and that she will speak no more:

Odin again asks the Völva to not be silent and asks her who will avenge Baldr's death. The Völva replies that Váli will, when he will be one night old. Once again, she says that she will speak no more:

Odin again asks the Völva to not be silent and says that he seeks to know who the women that will then weep be. The Völva realizes that Vegtam is Odin in disguise. Odin says that the Völva is not a Völva, and that she is the mother of three giants. The Völva tells Odin to ride back home proud, because she will speak to no more men until Loki escapes his bounds.

Prose Edda

In Gylfaginning, Baldur is described as follows:

Apart from this description, Baldr is known primarily for the story of his death, which is seen as the first in a chain of events that will ultimately lead to the destruction of the gods at Ragnarök. According to Völuspá, Baldr will be reborn in the new world.

He had a dream of his own death and his mother had the same dream. Since dreams were usually prophetic, this depressed him, so his mother Frigg made every object on earth vow never to hurt Baldr. All objects made this vow except mistletoe—a detail which has traditionally been explained with the idea that it was too unimportant and nonthreatening to bother asking it to make the vow, but which Merrill Kaplan has instead argued echoes the fact that young people were not eligible to swear legal oaths, which could make them a threat later in life.

When Loki, the mischief-maker, heard of this, he made a magical spear from this plant (in some later versions, an arrow). He hurried to the place where the gods were indulging in their new pastime of hurling objects at Baldr, which would bounce off without harming him. Loki gave the spear to Baldr's brother, the blind god Höðr, who then inadvertently killed his brother with it (other versions suggest that Loki guided the arrow himself). For this act, Odin and the asynja Rindr gave birth to Váli, who grew to adulthood within a day and slew Höðr.

Baldr was ceremonially burnt upon his ship, Hringhorni, the largest of all ships. As he was carried to the ship, Odin whispered in his ear. This was to be a key riddle asked by Odin (in disguise) of the giant Vafthrudnir (and which was unanswerable) in the poem Vafthrudnismal. The riddle also appears in the riddles of Gestumblindi in Hervarar saga.

The dwarf Litr was kicked by Thor into the funeral fire and burnt alive. Nanna, Baldr's wife, also threw herself on the funeral fire to await Ragnarök when she would be reunited with her husband (alternatively, she died of grief). Baldr's horse with all its trappings was also burned on the pyre. The ship was set to sea by Hyrrokin, a giantess, who came riding on a wolf and gave the ship such a push that fire flashed from the rollers and all the earth shook.

Upon Frigg's entreaties, delivered through the messenger Hermod, Hel promised to release Baldr from the underworld if all objects alive and dead would weep for him. All did, except a giantess, Þökk (often presumed to be the god Loki in disguise), who refused to mourn the slain god. Thus Baldr had to remain in the underworld, not to emerge until after Ragnarök, when he and his brother Höðr would be reconciled and rule the new earth together with Thor's sons.

Besides descriptions of Baldr, the Prose Edda also explicitly links Baldr to the Anglo-Saxon Beldeg in its prologue.

Gesta Danorum

Writing during the end of the 12th century, the Danish historian Saxo Grammaticus tells the story of Baldr (recorded as Balderus) in a form that professes to be historical.  According to him, Balderus and Høtherus were rival suitors for the hand of Nanna, daughter of Gewar, King of Norway. Balderus was a demigod and common steel could not wound his sacred body. The two rivals encountered each other in a terrific battle. Though Odin and Thor and the other gods fought for Balderus, he was defeated and fled away, and Høtherus married the princess.

Nevertheless, Balderus took heart of grace and again met Høtherus in a stricken field. But he fared even worse than before. Høtherus dealt him a deadly wound with a magic sword, named Mistletoe, which he had received from Mimir, the satyr of the woods; after lingering three days in pain Balderus died of his injury and was buried with royal honours in a barrow.

Chronicon Lethrense and Annales Lundenses
There are also two lesser known Danish Latin chronicles, the Chronicon Lethrense and the Annales Lundenses of which the latter is included in the former. These two sources provide a second euhemerized account of Höðr's slaying of Baldr.

It relates that Hother was the king of the Saxons and son of Hothbrodd and Hadding. Hother first slew Othen's (i.e. Odin) son Balder in battle and then chased Othen and Thor. Finally, Othen's son Both killed Hother. Hother, Balder, Othen and Thor were incorrectly considered to be gods.

Utrecht Inscription
A Latin votive inscription from Utrecht, from the 3rd or 4th century C.E., has been theorized as containing the dative form Baldruo, pointing to a Latin nominative singular *Baldruus, which some have identified with the Norse/Germanic god, although both the reading and this interpretation have been questioned.

Anglo-Saxon Chronicle 
In the Anglo-Saxon Chronicle Baldr is named as the ancestor of the monarchy of Kent, Bernicia, Deira, and Wessex through his supposed son Brond.

Eponyms

Plants

As referenced in Gylfaginning, in Sweden and Norway, the scentless mayweed (Matricaria perforata) and the similar sea mayweed (Matricaria maritima) are both called baldursbrá "Balder's brow" and regionally in northern England (baldeyebrow). In Iceland only the former is found. In Germany valerian is known as Baldrian; variations using or influenced by reflexes of Phol include Faltrian (upper Austria), Villumfallum (Salzburg), and Fildron or Faldron (Tyrol).

Toponyms
There are a few old place names in Scandinavia that contain the name Baldr. The most certain and notable one is the (former) parish name Balleshol in Hedmark county, Norway: "a Balldrshole" 1356 (where the last element is hóll m "mound; small hill"). Others may be (in Norse forms) Baldrsberg in Vestfold county, Baldrsheimr in Hordaland county Baldrsnes in Sør-Trøndelag county—and (very uncertain) the Balsfjorden fjord and Balsfjord municipality in Troms county.

In Copenhagen, there is also a Baldersgade, or "Balder's Street". A street in downtown Reykjavík is called Baldursgata (Baldur's Street).

In Sweden there is a Baldersgatan (Balder's Street) in Stockholm. There is also Baldersnäs (Balder's isthmus), Baldersvik (Balder's bay), Balders udde (Balder's headland) and Baldersberg (Balder's mountain) at various places.

In popular culture
Balder the Brave is a fictional character based on Baldr. He has appeared in comic books published by Marvel Comics as the half-brother of Thor, and son of Odin, ruler of the gods. 
Baldr is featured in a number of video games. In Ensemble Studios' 2002 video game Age of Mythology Baldr is one of nine minor gods Norse players can worship. Baldr (spelled Baldur in-game) is also the main antagonist in Santa Monica Studio's 2018 video game God of War. However, he differs greatly in the game from the Baldr depicted in Norse writings and traditional artistic depictions as he is much more aggressive, crude, and rugged in appearance.

See also
 List of Germanic deities
 Lemminkäinen

References

Bibliography

Further reading

 Anatoly Liberman, "Some Controversial Aspects of the Myth of Baldr," Alvíssmál 11 (2004): 17–54.
 John Lindow, Murder and Vengeance Among the Gods: Baldr in Scandinavian Mythology. Suomalainen Tiedeakatemia (1997), .
 Jacob Grimm, Deutsche Mythologie (1835), chapter 11 "Paltar".

External links

 MyNDIR (My Norse Digital Image Repository) Illustrations of Baldr from manuscripts and early print books. Clicking on the thumbnail will give you the full image and information concerning it.

 
Æsir
Germanic gods
Justice gods
Light gods
Sons of Odin
Killed deities
Norse gods
Life-death-rebirth gods